The D'Estrées class comprised two protected cruisers of the French Navy built in the late 1890s. They were ordered during a period of intense debate in the French fleet between officers who favored large armored cruisers and those who preferred smaller vessels more suited to long-distance cruising abroad. The D'Estrées-class cruisers were intended to operate in the French colonial empire.

D'Estrées and Infernet initially served in the Northern Squadron after entering service in the late 1890s, though they were quickly transferred elsewhere. D'Estrées went to the Atlantic station in 1902, while Infernet had been sent to French Madagascar by 1901. The latter ship then served a stint in the East Indies from 1903 to 1905, thereafter returning to France, where she was lost in an accidental grounding in 1910. D'Estrées was assigned to the 2nd Light Division at the start of World War I in August 1914 before being moved to the Syrian Division, where she took part in operations against Ottoman forces ashore. She patrolled the Red Sea and Indian Ocean from 1916 to the end of the war in 1918. D'Estrées was then sent to East Asia, where she served until being discarded in 1922.

Design
In the 1880s and 1890s, factions in the French Navy's officer corps argued over the types of cruiser that best served France's interests. Some argued for a fleet of small but fast protected cruisers for commerce raiding, another sought larger and more powerful armored cruisers that were useful for patrolling the country's colonial possessions, while another preferred vessels more suited to operations with the home fleet of battleships. A third member of the class, provisionally designated "K3", was authorized in 1897 but was not built; by that time, the French naval command had decided to build larger armored cruisers for all cruiser tasks, including colonial patrol duties.

Characteristics and machinery

They displaced . Their crew numbered 235 officers and enlisted men.

The ships' hulls included a ram bow and an overhanging stern, but unlike other French cruisers of the period, they lacked a double bottom or a longitudinal bulkhead. Below the waterline, they were covered with a layer of wood and copper sheathing to protect them from biofouling on extended voyages overseas, where they would not have reliable access to shipyard facilities. The ships had a flush deck and a minimal superstructure, consisting primarily of a small conning tower. They had three pole masts, though one was later removed from each vessel.

The ships' propulsion system consisted of a pair of vertical triple-expansion steam engines driving two screw propellers. Each engine was placed in its own engine room, divided by a watertight bulkhead to prevent flooding from disabling both engines. Steam was provided by eight coal-burning Normand-type water-tube boilers that were ducted into two widely-spaced funnels. The boilers were divided into pairs in four boiler rooms.

Warship International, citing the 1905 Marine Almanac, credits the class with a cruising radius of just  at 10 knots.

Armament and armor

The ships were armed with a main battery of two  Modèle 1893 45-caliber guns. They were placed in individual pivot mounts with gun shields, one forward and aft on the centerline.

The main battery was supported by a secondary battery of four  Modèle 1891 guns, which were carried in sponsons in the hull. One pair was placed abreast the conning tower, and the other set of guns was located on either side of the rear funnel.

For close-range defense against torpedo boats, the vessels carried eight  3-pounder Hotchkiss guns and two  1-pounder guns. These were mounted in individual pivot mountings that were distributed along the length of the ship, some atop the upper deck and others firing through gun ports in the upper deck. The ships were also equipped with fourteen naval mines.

Above the deck at the sides, a cofferdam filled with cellulose was intended to contain flooding from damage below the waterline.

Construction

Service history

D'Estrées served in the Northern Squadron after her completion in 1899, where she was joined by Infernet by early 1901. The latter vessel was transferred to French Madagascar later in 1901, and in 1902, D'Estrées was reassigned to the Atlantic Training Division. She remained there for the next several years, though the unit went through a series of name changes and reorganizations. Infernet was moved again in 1903, this time to the East Indies to protect French interests in the region. She returned to France in 1905. In 1908, D'Estrées was sent to patrol the West Indies, and by that time, the Atlantic Division had been merged into the Northern Squadron. Infernets career was cut short in 1910, when she ran aground off Les Sables-d'Olonne in 1910 and could not be pulled free.

At the start of World War I in August 1914, D'Estrées was initially assigned to the 2nd Light Squadron, which was based in the English Channel, but was quickly transferred to reinforce the Syrian Division for operations against the Ottoman Empire. D'Estrées bombarded Ottoman positions along the Syrian coast and helped to enforce a blockade there. She also assisted in the evacuation of some 4,000 Armenians from Antakya on 12 and 13 September, along with several other French cruisers. She was moved to the Red Sea in 1916, where she patrolled for the German commerce raider , which was known to be operating in the Indian Ocean. She remained in the region for the rest of the war, though she saw no further action. After the war, she was sent to French Indochina, where she spent the remainder of her career. D'Estrées was struck from the naval register in 1922 and broken up.

Notes

References
 
 
 
 
 
 
 
 
 
 
 
 
 
 
 
 
 
 
 
 

Cruiser classes
 
Ship classes of the French Navy